Operation Life was a nonprofit organization in Las Vegas (Clark County), founded by Ruby Dunan, Aldine Weems, Alversa Beals, Rosie Seals, Essie Henderson, Emma Stampley, and Mary Wesley in May 1972, that campaigned for welfare rights in West Las Vegas. The founders of Operation Life organization along with a group of Westside mothers, Ruby Duncan, Aldine Weems, Mary Wesley, Essie Henderson, Alversa Beals, Emma Stampley, Rosie Seals, Roma Jean Hunt and many others campaigned for welfare rights. The women also founded the Clark County Welfare Rights Organization in 1967 which later became Operation Life, which was also a chapter of the National Welfare Rights Organization.

Ruby Duncan was the executive director of Operation Life from 1972 until 1990 when she retired due to her health. The organization established the first library, first day care center, and first public swimming pool in Las Vegas's Westside neighborhood, and also created a children's medical clinic, a jobs program, and a drug and violence prevention program, among other services. Operation Life employed over 100 people, mostly former welfare mothers, by 1980. The organization received grants in the 1980s from the city of Las Vegas and the U.S. Dept. of Housing to build new housing for low-income families. The nonprofit ceased operations in 1992.

Further reading
Orleck, Annelise. Storming Caesars Palace: How Black Mothers Fought Their Own War on Poverty, Boston: Beacon Press, (2006) .

References

Organizations established in 1972
Organizations disestablished in 1992
Organizations based in Las Vegas
1972 establishments in Nevada
1992 disestablishments in Nevada